A safe harbor is a provision of a statute or a regulation that specifies that certain conduct will be deemed not to violate a given rule.  It is usually found in connection with a more-vague, overall standard.  By contrast, "unsafe harbors" describe conduct that will be deemed to violate the rule.

For example, in the context of a statute that requires drivers to "not drive recklessly," a clause specifying that "driving under 25 miles per hour will be conclusively deemed not to constitute reckless driving" is a "safe harbor."  Likewise, a clause saying that "driving over 90 miles per hour will be conclusively deemed to constitute reckless driving" would be an "unsafe harbor."  In this example, driving between 25 miles per hour and 90 miles per hour would fall outside of either a safe harbor or an unsafe harbor, and would thus be left to be judged according to the vague "reckless" standard.

Theoretical justifications
Safe harbors have been promoted by legal writers as reducing the uncertainty created by simply employing a vague standard (such as "recklessness").  On the other hand, this type of rule formulation also avoids the problem of creating a precise rule that leaves a judge with no available discretion to allow for "hard cases." In theory, the safe harbor formulation can combine the virtues of vague standards and precise rules, allowing legislatures to prescribe with certainty the advance outcome for specific foreseeable cases, and to leave to judges to decide the cases that remain.

Criticisms
Safe harbors can create precise rules that will be applied in unintended ways. For example, driving under 25 miles per hour in a 60 MPH zone when not required by traffic or other conditions could be reckless driving.

United States
An example of safe harbor is performance of a Phase I Environmental Site Assessment by a property purchaser: thus affecting due diligence and a "safe harbor" outcome if future contamination is found caused by a prior owner.

The Digital Millennium Copyright Act (DMCA) has notable safe-harbor provisions which protect Internet service providers from the consequences of their users' actions. (Similarly, the EU directive on electronic commerce provides a similar provision of "mere conduit" which, while not exactly the same, serves much the same function as the DMCA safe harbor in this instance.) 

In the context of environmental protection, a voluntary safe harbor agreement can be undertaken between property owners and the United States Fish and Wildlife Service (FWS) or the National Oceanic and Atmospheric Administration (NOAA) under which a property owner undertakes actions that protect and aid the recovery an endangered species protected under the Endangered Species Act with habitat on their property. In exchange, the FWS or NOAA promises not to require any additional or different conservation activities on the property without the property holder's consent. When the agreement expires, the property owner is permitted to return the landscape to its original baseline condition if they so desire.

Safe Harbor laws are being used across the United States to address how children are treated when they become victims of human trafficking and commercial sexual exploitation of children (CSEC). These laws are being used in New York, Florida and 20 other states (as of 2014) to "address the inconsistent treatment" that children receive after they are exploited sexually. The laws are used to ensure exploited children are treated as "victims", not as "criminals".

European Union

There is an example of a safe harbor decision in reference to the EU Data Protection Directive. The Directive sets comparatively strict privacy protections for EU citizens.  It prohibits European firms from transferring personal data to overseas jurisdictions with weaker privacy laws. Five years later, a decision created exceptions where foreign recipients of the data voluntarily agreed to meet EU standards under the International Safe Harbor Privacy Principles. In October 2015, following a court decision by the Court of Justice of the European Union, the safe harbor agreement between the EU and US was declared invalid on the grounds that the US was not supplying an equally adequate level of protection against surveillance for data being transferred there.

India 
Safe harbour rules are part of the taxation laws in India under which multinational companies declaring certain minimum operational profits will not be subject to rigorous transfer pricing audits. The rules were issued in June 2017 amending the earlier notification from 2013. The current safe harbour rules lower the minimum operation profits declared by software development and ITeS companies, to avoid an audit, to 17-18% depending on the previous year's turnover. For KPO companies, safe harbour rates are set at 18-24%. These rates are effective for the Assessment Years 2017–18 to 2019–20.

See also
 Section 230

References

Legal doctrines and principles
Legal defenses